Abu Bakr Muhammad ibn Ibrahim ibn al-Mundhir al-Naysaburi was a student of Shafi'i scholar al-Rabi' ibn Sulayman who was in turn a direct student of al-Shafi'i. He would later reach the level of ijtihad but with little exception ascribe to the legal opinions of al-Shafi'i.

Footnotes

Citations

References

Shafi'is
Atharis
855 births
930 deaths
9th-century jurists
10th-century jurists